Monsieur Tranquille is a character in the Canadian children's television series Patof voyage. He is well known for the 1977 disco hit Ma'm Thibault. He was portrayed by actor-comedian Roger Giguère.

Children's TV shows
Mr. Tranquille is first mentioned in the television series Patof raconte (CFTM-TV, 1975). Played by the soundman Roger Giguère, it's an invisible character and he interacts with the clown Patof by means of sound and music effects. It's only in the series Patof voyage (CFTM-TV, 1976) that Roger Giguère embodies him as a puppet.

Lesley Tranquille (a play on words meaning "leave him alone") quickly wins the heart of the children. A single recorded in January 1977, Madame Thibault becomes a number one in Quebec.  A disco version, mostly instrumental except for the phrase "Ma'm Thibault", is created and becomes a club hit. The single is even issued in France and Australia, where it becomes very popular.  The song credited to "Tranquille", to dissociate from the TV character, is also issued on a K-tel double-LP compilation called Disco Fever (1978).

In September 1977, Mr. Tranquille get his own television series called Monsieur Tranquille (CFTM-TV, 1977). To increase the popularity of the character, two LPs, several coloring books and posters, as well as a series of eight comic books illustrated by Henri Desclez are published.

The following season, a new series called Le monde de Monsieur Tranquille (CFTM-TV, 1978) was created to be more educational. However, the series was canceled mid-season (mostly due to competition with the Ever-Popular Bobino on rival Ici Radio-Canada Télé airing at the same timeslot).

In spite of a short career, Mr. Tranquille fired the imagination of a generation of Québécois. Songs like Faut pas me chercher (a duet  with Patof, 1976), Madame Thibault (1977), Ça va pas dans l'soulier? (1977), Les monstres (1977), Farnande (1977) and Pepperoni are among his greatest hits.

Filmography

Television Series
 1975-1976 Patof raconte
 1976-1977 Patof voyage
 1977-1978 Monsieur Tranquille
 1978 Le monde de Monsieur Tranquille

DVD
 2011 Bonjour Patof (Musicor Produits Spéciaux)

Discography

Albums

Singles

European release

Australian release

Compilations

Collaborations and performances as guest star

Charts

Reconstituted chart

Songs 
Title / Date / Best rank / Weeks on chart
 1977 Madame Thibault / 1977-01-29 / #1 / 19 weeks on chart
 1978 Pepperoni / 1978-02-18 / #21 / 3 weeks on chart

Albums 
Title / Date / Best rank / Weeks on Top 30
 1977 Monsieur Tranquille – Faut pas m'chercher / 1977-03-05 / #3 / 12 weeks in Top 30

Bibliography

Comics 
 1977 Monsieur Tranquille – N° 1 (illustrated by Henri Desclez; text by Claude Leclerc), Éditions Héritage
 1977 Monsieur Tranquille – N° 2 (illustrated by Henri Desclez; text by Claude Leclerc), Éditions Héritage
 1977 Monsieur Tranquille – N° 3 : Super-diva (illustrated by Henri Desclez; text by Claude Leclerc), Éditions Héritage
 1977 Monsieur Tranquille – N° 4 : Un numéro super explosif! (avec Junior Tranquille et Minibus) (illustrated by Henri Desclez; text by Claude Leclerc), Éditions Héritage
 1977 Monsieur Tranquille – N° 5 : Un numéro spatial (avec Junior Tranquille et Minibus) (illustrated by Henri Desclez; text by Claude Leclerc), Éditions Héritage
 1977 Monsieur Tranquille – N° 6 : Un numéro fumeux!... (11 pages de jeux et d'activités) (illustrated by Henri Desclez; text by Claude Leclerc), Éditions Héritage
 1978 Monsieur Tranquille – N° 7 (illustrated by Henri Desclez; text by Claude Leclerc), Éditions Héritage
 1978 Monsieur Tranquille – N° 8 (illustrated by Henri Desclez; text by Claude Leclerc), Éditions Héritage

Awards and Recognitions 
 1977 Golden record for the single Madame Thibault

See also
List of disco artists (L-R)

References

External links
 French Blog about Mr. Tranquille, Patof and Jacques Desrosiers

Television characters introduced in 1976